The 3rd Alpine Group was a formation of the Royal Italian Army manned by Alpini troops that participated in the Axis invasion of Yugoslavia during World War II.

Notes

References
 

Military units and formations of Italy in World War II
Military units and formations of Italy in Yugoslavia in World War II